Michiko is a Japanese given name, used for females. Although written romanized the same way, the Japanese language written forms (kanji, katakana, hiragana) can be different.  Common forms include:

 美智子 — "beautiful wise child"
 美千子 — "child of a thousand beauties"
 見知子 — "child of recognition"
 道子 — "child of the way"
 路子 — "child of the road"
 倫子 — "child of morals"
 皆子 — "child of all"
 通子 — "child of passage"
Phonetic spellings (no particular meaning):
 みちこ (in hiragana)
 ミチコ (in katakana)

People
 Michiko Shoda (正田 美智子), later Empress Michiko of Japan
, Japanese nurse and politician
 Michiko Fukushima (長谷川-福島 實智子), a Japanese sport shooter from Kumaishi, Hokkaidō Japan
 Michiko Godai (五大 路子), Japanese actress from Yokohama, Japan
 Michiko Hada (羽田 美智子), an actress from  Mitsukaido, Japan
 Michiko Hattori (服部道子), Japanese professional golfer and former Player of the Year on the Japan LPGA
 Michiko Hamamura (浜村 美智子), Japanese singer and actress from Osaka, Japan
, Japanese actress and voice actress
 Horibe Michiko (堀部美智子), a Japanese ski mountaineer and telemark skier
 Michiko Inukai (犬養 道子), Japanese Roman-Catholic author and philanthropist
, Japanese politician
 Michiko Ishimure (石牟礼道子), a Japanese writer
 Michiko Itatani (born 1948), Japanese artist 
 Michiko Kakutani (角谷 美智子), an American literary critic
, Japanese communist
 Michiko Kashiwabara (柏原 理子), a Japanese cross-country skier who competed at the 2010 Winter Olympic Games
 Michiko Katagiri, paralympic swimmer from Japan
, Japanese actress and singer
 Michiko Kichise (吉瀬 美智子), a Japanese actress
 Michiko Kon (今道子), Japanese photographer
 Michiko Kono,  Japanese former cricketer
 Michiko Koshino (小篠 美智子), a Japanese fashion designer
 Michiko Maeda (前田通子), Japanese film and television actress from Osaka
, former Japanese football player
 Michiko Matsumoto (松本 路子), Japanese photographer
 Michiko Nagai (永井路子), Japanese historical fiction writer
 Michiko Neya (根谷 美智子), a voice actress from Echizen, Fukui Japan
 Michiko Nishiwaki (西脇 美智子), a Japanese stunt woman, actress, martial artist, and former female bodybuilder
 Michiko Nomura (野村 道子, born 1938), a voice actress
 Michiko Naruke (なるけ みちこ), a Japanese video game composer
 Michiko Okada,  Japanese professional golfer who played on the LPGA of Japan Tour
, Japanese former professional wrestler
, Japanese long-distance runner
, Japanese television personality, comedian and actress
 Michiko Shiokawa (塩川 美知子), retired Japanese volleyball player who competed in the 1972 Summer Olympics
 Michiko Suganuma (菅沼　三千子), Kamakura-bori now Wagae-nuri artist from Japan
 Michiko Tanaka (田中路子, 1913-1988), a Japanese actress and singer who was married to German stage and film actor Viktor de Kowa
, Japanese curler
, Japanese politician
, Japanese writer and poet
Michiko Yamamoto (screenwriter) (born 1979), Filipino screenwriter
, Japanese designer and textile artist
 Michiko Yokote (横手 美智子), a Japanese screenwriter

Fictional characters
 Michiko Malandro (ミチコ・マランドロ), protagonist of the anime series Michiko to Hatchin
 Michiko Sawada (沢田・ミチ子), a character from manga and anime Perman
 Michiko, a character from anime Dennō Coil
 Daimon Michiko (大門未知子), eponymous protagonist of the successful Japanese television series Doctor-X: Surgeon Michiko Daimon   (ドクターX〜外科医・大門未知子〜) (2012-2021)
Michiko (美智子), a hunter in the video game Identity V

Japanese feminine given names